Secret of the Runes may refer to:
The Secret of the Runes, a book by Guido von List
Secret of the Runes (album), an album by Swedish symphonic metal band Therion